La Pe  is a town and municipality in Oaxaca in south-western Mexico. The municipality covers an area of  km². 
It is part of the Ejutla District in the south of the Valles Centrales Region. This municipality is located in the central part of the state of Oaxaca, in the central valley region. It belongs to the Ejutla district. It is located in 96° 48´ west longitude, 16° 38´ north latitude and its height is 1490 meters over the sea level. To the north it there is the municipality of  Ayoquezco de Aldama and  Ejutla de Crespo, to the south is Ejutla de Crespo, to the east is Ejutla de Crespo and to the west with Ejutla de Crespo. It has an area of 26.79 square kilometers. It is not a mountainous area. Its weather is lukewarm with very little variations during the year. It has semiarid vegetation. It has 2135 inhabitants and the majority of them are of the Catholic religion. As of 2005, the municipality had a total population of 2,135.

History

In the prehispanic era some isolated “zapotecas” groups were the first population of this municipality. In Mexico's independence the first big ranch of the municipality got established. There was a construction of rail roads that belong to the Mexican South train company. Sugar, corn and beans began being cultivated, agriculture was the main economic activity.

References

Municipalities of Oaxaca